Nemicolopterus is a genus of tapejaromorph pterosaur, based on a very small specimen described as the smallest known "adult" pterosaur to date. It lived in the Jehol Biota 120 million years ago.

Discovery and naming 
The generic name "Nemicolopterus" comes from the following Greek words: "Nemos" meaning "forest", "ikolos" meaning "dweller", and Latinised "pteron" meaning "wing". The specific name crypticus is from "kryptos", meaning "hidden". Thus "Nemicolopterus crypticus" means "Hidden flying forest dweller".

Description 
 
The type fossil specimen of N. crypticus, catalog number IVPP V-14377, is housed in the collection of the Institute of Vertebrate Paleontology and Paleoanthropology in Beijing, China. The fossil was collected from the Jiufotang Formation, which is of Aptian age (120 mya). It was discovered in the Luzhhouou locality of Yaolugou Town, Jianchang County, Huludao City, western Liaoning Province in northeastern China. It has a wingspan of slightly under 25 centimeters (10 in), making it smaller than all but a few specimens of hatchling pterosaurs. Wang et al. (2008), who originally described the specimen, concluded that it was immature, citing the amount of bone fusion and the ossification of the toes, gastralia, and sternum as indicating that it was a sub-adult rather than a hatchling. However, Darren Naish argued on his popular weblog that, due to the hypothesis that pterosaurs were highly precocial, bone fusion and ossification could have occurred very early in life, and that Nemicolopterus might in fact be a hatchling individual of the genus Sinopterus. This identification was formally presented in 2021 study, which found that Nemicolopterus fit into a growth series as a young juvenile or hatchling Sinopterus hatchling.

Classification 
An analysis of pterosaur relationships by Andres and colleagues in 2014 found the specimen in a sister group relationship with "Sinopterus" gui.

A 2023 revision of Sinopterus concluded that it was impossible to assign the Nemicolopterus specimen to either Sinopterus or the new genus Huaxiadraco, and it was therefore considered an indeterminate sinopterine.

See also 
 List of pterosaur genera
 Timeline of pterosaur research
 Pterosaur size
 Smallest organisms

References

Early Cretaceous pterosaurs of Asia
Tapejaromorphs
Fossil taxa described in 2008
Taxa named by Alexander Kellner
Jiufotang fauna